"Old Photographs" is a song recorded by American country music group Sawyer Brown.  It was released in April 1988 as the third single from the album Somewhere in the Night.  The song reached #27 on the Billboard Hot Country Singles & Tracks chart.  The song was written by Kix Brooks, Kenneth Beal and Bill McClelland.

Chart performance

References

1988 singles
1987 songs
Sawyer Brown songs
Songs written by Kix Brooks
Song recordings produced by Ron Chancey
Capitol Records singles
Curb Records singles